The Amazing Grace is a 2006 British Nigerian historical drama film written by Jeta Amata and Nick Moran, directed by Jeta Amata and produced by Jeta Amata & Alicia Arce. The film stars Joke Silva, Nick Moran, Scott Cleverdon, Mbong Odungide, Fred Amata and Zack Amata. The film received 11 nominations and won the award for Achievement in Cinematography at the Africa Movie Academy Awards in 2007.

Premise
The film, occasionally narrated by Joke Silva, tells the reformation story of British slave trader John Newton (Nick Moran), sailing to what is now Nigeria to buy slaves. Later, increasingly shocked by the brutality of slavery, he gave up the trade and became an Anglican priest. Newton later wrote the redemptive hymn Amazing Grace and became an abolitionist.

Cast
Nick Moran as John Newton
Joke Silva as Maria Davies
Scott Cleverdon as Oliver
Mbong Odungide as Ansa
Fred Amata as Etim
Zack Amata as  Village Priest
Itam Efa Williamson as Orok
James Hicks as Simmons
Ita Bassey as Chief
Nick Goff as Rupert

See also
 List of Nigerian films of 2006

References

External links
 
 

2006 films
Films directed by Jeta Amata
English-language Nigerian films
2006 biographical drama films
British biographical drama films
Films set in the 18th century
Films set in the 1750s
Nigerian biographical films
2000s historical drama films
2006 drama films
Films about slavery
British films based on actual events
Nigerian films based on actual events
2000s English-language films
2000s British films